Confédération africaine des travailleurs croyants-Republique Centrafricain ('African Confederation of Believing Workers-Central African Republic', abbreviated CATC) was a national trade union centre in the Central African Republic. The organization emerged from the Ubangi-Shari branch of the French trade union centre CFTC, which became the Ubangi-Shari affiliate of the Confédération africaine des travailleurs croyants in 1957. CATC was affiliated to the International Federation of Christian Trade Unions.

In 1964 CATC was merged, under government pressure, into Union générale des travailleurs centrafricains.

References

Trade unions in the Central African Republic
World Confederation of Labour
Defunct trade unions of Africa
Defunct organisations based in the Central African Republic
Trade unions established in 1957
Trade unions disestablished in 1964